The Leftovers is an American supernatural mystery drama television series created and produced by Damon Lindelof and Tom Perrotta, based on Perrotta's novel of the same name. It premiered on HBO on June 29, 2014, and ran for three seasons, ending on June 4, 2017. The series features an ensemble cast that includes Justin Theroux, Amy Brenneman, Christopher Eccleston, Liv Tyler, Chris Zylka, Margaret Qualley, Carrie Coon, Ann Dowd, Regina King, Kevin Carroll and Jovan Adepo. 

The series takes place in a variety of locations, including New York (seasons 1–2), Texas (seasons 2–3) and Victoria, Australia (season 3). It begins three years after the "Sudden Departure", a global event that resulted in 2% of the world's population disappearing, and follows the lives of those who were left behind.

Series overview

Episodes

Season 1 (2014)
The first season consists of ten episodes and aired from June 29 to September 7, 2014. It takes place primarily in the small town of Mapleton, New York, three years after the "Sudden Departure" – an event which saw 2% of the world's population (approximately 140 million people) disappear and profoundly affected the townspeople. The characters of police chief Kevin Garvey and his family (wife Laurie, son Tom, daughter Jill and father Kevin Sr.) are focal points of the season, alongside grieving widow Nora Durst, her brother Reverend Matt Jamison, and the mysterious cult-like organization the Guilty Remnant (GR), led by Patti Levin. 

The first season follows multiple storylines, notably the fallout from the Departure and the subsequent grief, anger and fear the townspeople share with the rest of the world. The season also focuses on Kevin's failing attempts to maintain order in the town and to keep his family together, the GR's increasingly nefarious schemes and the townspeople's sentiment against them, Matt's crisis of faith, and Nora's attempts to move on and conceal the pain she has been harboring since the Departure. 

The first episode has no opening credits, while the opening theme for the other nine episodes is "The Leftovers (Main Title Theme)" by series composer Max Richter.

Season 2 (2015)
The second season consists of ten episodes and aired from October 10 to December 6, 2015. It takes place a year after the first season, centering around the fourth anniversary of the Departure. While some scenes take place in Mapleton, New York (the first season's setting) and other locations, the majority of the season takes place in Jarden, Texas, also known as Miracle, a town from which no one departed. The town has become a tourist site and a popular destination, leading Kevin, Nora, Matt and other characters from the first season to move to Miracle. New characters introduced include town staples the Murphy family: father John, mother Erika, daughter Evie and son Michael. 

The second season follows multiple storylines, notably the ideological battle between those who believe Miracle is special and those who do not, Kevin and Nora's relationship being tested by Kevin's increasingly erratic mental state, the Murphy family's search for their missing daughter, and Matt's attempts to prove the existence of a miracle only he witnessed. 

The opening theme for all ten episodes is "Let the Mystery Be" by Iris DeMent.

Season 3 (2017)
The third and final season consists of eight episodes and aired from April 16 to June 4, 2017. It takes place three years after the second season, centering around the seventh anniversary of the Departure. The first two episodes take place in Jarden, Texas (the second season's setting) and other locations, while the final six episodes primarily take place in the state of Victoria, Australia (which the characters believe will be the site of an apocalyptic event on the anniversary of the Departure). Kevin Sr. becomes a main character, after recurring in the first two seasons. 

The third season follows multiple storylines, notably Matt and Kevin Sr.'s belief that the seventh anniversary of the Departure will bring an apocalyptic flood in Australia, Kevin coming to terms with his apparent immortality and coming to believe that it is his destiny to prevent the apocalypse, and Nora grappling with a scientific discovery that could reunite her with her family. 

The first episode has no opening credits, while the opening theme for the final seven episodes changes with every episode.

Ratings

References

External links
 
 

Lists of American drama television series episodes
The Leftovers (TV series)